The Little Dąbrowa (Polish: Jezioro Dąbrowa Mała, German: Klein Damerau See) is a lake in Poland near the gmina Dąbrówno. The Great Dąbrowa lake is nearby.

Lakes of Poland
Lakes of Warmian-Masurian Voivodeship